This is a list of rural localities in the Republic of Karelia. The Republic of Karelia is a federal subject of Russia (a republic), located in the northwest of Russia. Its capital is the city of Petrozavodsk. Its population in 2010 was 643,548.

Belomorsky District 
Rural localities in Belomorsky District:

 Nyukhcha

Kemsky District 
Rural localities in Kemsky District:

 14 km dorogi Kem-Kalevala
 6 km dorogi Kem-Kalevala
 Panozero

Kondopozhsky District 
Rural localities in Kondopozhsky District:

 Unitsa
 Voknavolok

Kostomuksha 
Rural localities in Kostomuksha urban okrug:

 Voknavolok

Lakhdenpokhsky District 
Rural localities in Lakhdenpokhsky District:

 Elisenvaara
 Khiytola

Loukhsky District 
Rural localities in Loukhsky District:

 Kestenga

Medvezhyegorsky District 
Rural localities in Medvezhyegorsky District:

 Velikaya Guba

Muyezersky District 
Rural localities in Muyezersky District:

 Ledmozero

Pitkyarantsky District 
Rural localities in Pitkyarantsky District:

 Salmi

Prionezhsky District 
Rural localities in Prionezhsky District:

 Besovets
 Shyoltozero

Pryazhinsky District 
Rural localities in Pryazhinsky District:

 Kinerma

Pudozhsky District 
Rural localities in Pudozhsky District:

 Avdeyevo

Segezhsky District 
Rural localities in Segezhsky District:

 Kochkoma

Sortavala 
Rural localities in Sortavala urban okrug:

 Ruskeala

Suoyarvsky District 
Rural localities in Suoyarvsky District:

 Naistenjärvi
 Porosozero

See also 
 
 Lists of rural localities in Russia

References 

Karelia